Dalian Rail Transit (abbreviation: DRT), according to the order of construction, includes the  Dalian trams, the Dalianren light rail and the Dalian Rapid Transit (Dalian Metro). The Dalian Rapid Transit system is divided into the Kuaigui  and Ditie. The Kuaigui is the overground system mainly running in the suburban area, while the Ditie is the underground system operating in the urban area. Announcements of the DRT are made in Mandarin and English. As of November 1, 2015, DRT has about 170 kilometers of track.

History

November 8, 2002 – Line 3 first period: Xianglujiao to Jinshitan trial operation began.
May 1, 2003 – Line 3: Xianglujiao to Jinshitan opened.
September 29, 2004 – Line 3 second period: Xianglujiao to Dalian opened.
December 18, 2006 – Line 3: Xiaoyaowan opened.
July 7, 2008 – Line 3: Kaifaqu to Jiuli branch line trial operation began.
December 28, 2008 – Line 3: Kaifaqu to Jiuli opened.
May 1, 2014 – No 202: Caidaling to Lüshunxingang opened.
April 40, 2015 – Line 2 first period: Huiyizhongxin to Jichang trial operation began.
May 22, 2015 – Line 2: Huiyizhongxin to Jichang opened.
October 30, 2015 – Line 1 first period: Yaojia to Fuguojie opened.

Lines

 T1 　
Shahekouhuochezhan – Xinggongjie – Zhenggongjie – Wuyiguangchang – Datongjie – Beijingjie – Shichangjie – Dongguanjie – Dalianhuochezhan – Shengliqiao – Minshengjie – Minzhuguangchang – Shijijie – Sanbaguangchang – Erqiguangchang – Siergou – Chunhaijie – Hualeguangchang – Haichangxincheng – Jinguangdonghaian – Haizhiyungongyuan

 T2 　
Xinggongjie – Jinhuishangcheng – Jiefangguangchang – Gongchengjie – Hepingguangchang – Huizhanzhongxin – Xinghaiguangchang – Huawusuo – Yidaeryuan – Xinghaigongyuan – Heishijiao – Hongjishuxiangyuan – Haishidaxue – Wandaguangchang – Gaoxinyuanqu – Zhongguohualu – Qixianling – Hekou – Xiaopingdaoqian

 R1 　
●(M1) Jichangxinqu – Jinbohaiandikuaier – Jinzhouxi – Shimao (● means the metro interchange station.)

 R2 　
●(M1, M8) Hekou – Caidaling – Huangnichuan – Longwangtang – Tahewan – ●(R10) Lüshun – Tieshan – Lüshunxingang (Hekou means the metro station out of operation.)

 R3 　
●(M5, M6) Dalian – Xianglujiao – ●(M4) Jinjiajie – Quanshui – ●(R4, M5) Houyan – Dalianwan – Kuaiguicheliangduan – ●(M9) Jinmalu – ●(R3)Kaifaqu – ···
··· – Baoshuiqu – Gaochengshan – Shuangdigang – Xiaoyaowan – Huanghaidadao – Jinshitan
··· – Tongshitai – Hongweilanshan – Dongshanlu – Hepinglu – Shijiuju – ●(R4) Jiuli

 R4 　
●(M1, M2) Dalianbeizhan – ●(R3, M5) Houyan – ●(M9) Taocicheng – Jinzhou – Bayilu – Shijiuju – ●(R3) Jiuli – Shisanli – ●(M10)Ershilipu – Sanshilipu – Shihegaotiezhan – Haiyangdaxue – Beihai – Changdianpu – Guafuqiao – Gongjiaozongzhan – Sanshisizhong – Zhenxinglu

 M1 　
●(M9) Xinjichang – ●(R1) Jichangxinqu – ●(M5) Houguancun – Yaojia – ●(R4, M2) Dalianbeizhan – Huabeilu – Huananbei – Huananguangchang – Qianshanlu – ●(M4) Songjianglu – Dongweilu – Chunliu – Xianggongjie – Zhongchangjie – ●(M6) Xinggongjie – ●(M2) Xi'anlu – Fuguojie – ●(M7) Huizhanzhongxin – Xinghaiguangchang – Xinghaigongyuan – Heishijiao – Xueyuanguangchang – Lingshui – Qixianling – ●(R2, M8) Hekou

 M2 　
Haizhiyun – Donghai – Donggang – Huiyizhongxin – ●(M7)Gangwanguangchang – ●(M6) Zhongshanguangchang – Youhaoguangchang – Qingniwaqiao – Yierjiujie – Renminguangchang – Lianhelu – ●(M1) Xi'anlu – Jiaotongdaxue – Liaoshi – Malanguangchang – Wanjia – Hongqixilu – ●(M6) Hongjinlu – Hongganglu – Jichang – ●(M4) Xinzhaizi – Qiange – Zhongge – Gezhenpu – Houge – Weishengzhongxin – ●(M8) Tiyuzhongxin – Nanguanling – ●(R4, M1) Dalianbeizhan

 M4 　
●(R1, R10) Yingchengzi – Xinfucun – Qianmu – Muchengyishuiku – ●(M6) Zhoujiagou – Xinyijie – Xinpingjie – ●(M2) Xinzhaizi – Gongyedaxue – Zelonghu – Xindajie – ●(M8) Xibeilu – ●(M1) Songjianglu – Huadonglu – ●(R3) Jinjiajie – Dongfanglu – ●(M5) Suoyuwan – Dashihua – Huangshanpaotai – Longtoushi

 M5 　
●(M6) Hutanxinqu – Laohutan – Jingshanjie – Taoyuan – Shikuilu – ●(M7) Laodonggongyuan – Youhaojie – ●(R3, M6) Dalian – Suoyuwannan – ●(M4) Suoyuwan – Ganjingzi – Ganbeilu – Shanhuajie – Zhonghualu – Quanshuidong – Qianyan – ●(R3, R4) Houyan – ●(M1) Houguancun

 M6 　
●(R1) Xiajiahezi – Xinbojie – ●(M4) Zhoujiagou – Shengtaikejicheng – Xinshuilu – Yinjiatun – Zhangqianlu – Quzhengfu – ●(M2) Hongjinlu – Jinxiu – ●(M8) Jinjianglu – Xinshenglu – Lüboqiao – Changxingjie – ●(M1) Xinggongjie – Zhengongjie – Datongjie – Shichangjie – ●(R3, M5) Dalian – Shengliqiao – ●(M2) Zhongshanguangchang – ●(M7) Sanbaguangchang – Shikuilu – Yinbinlu – Laohutan – ●(M5) Hutanxinqu

 M7 　
Baiheshanzhuang – ●(M8) Xuezijie – Ligongdaxue – Wencuijie – Shumaguangchang – Gaojiacun – Xinanlu – Nanshajie – ●(M1) Huizhanzhongxin – Chengrenjie – Jianzhushejiyuan – Changchunlu – Maotianlu – ●(M5) Laodonggongyuan – Ertonggongyuan – ●(M6) Sanbaguangchang – ●(M2)Gangwanguangchang

 M8 　
Xiaopingdao – ●(R2, M1) Hekou – Qixianling – ●(M7) Xuezijie – Miaolingcun – Lingshuikeyun – Honglingqiao – Fuminlu – ●(M6) Jinjianglu – Yingkeguangchang – ●(M4) Xibeilu – Paoaibei – Heziqiao – ●(M2) Tiyuxincheng – Qipanmonan – Qipanmo

 T3 　
Xinggongjie – Zhongchangxisijie – Xinjianxijie – Fangcaoyuan – Lüboqiao – Xinshenglu – Jinjiangyuan – Jinshilu – Jinxiuxiaoqu – Meishuriji – Huanlexueshijie – Sandingchuntian – Shengshiyuannongzhuang – Xinrongjie – Shoushangongyuan

 T4 　
Xinggongjie – Shahekou – Xianggongjie – Chejiacun – Chunliu – Liujiaqiao – Zhoushuiqian – Zhoushuizi – Dongweilu – Wangjiaqiao – Zhoujiajie – Jinsanjiaoshichang – Jinjiajie – Jinjiajiekuaiguizhan – Jiaojianjie – Jiaofangjie – Ganjingzigongyuan – Yinghuayuan

 M3 　
Fujiazhuang – Zhongxialu – Bayilu – ●(M5) Shikuilu – Shifengjie – Baiyunshan – ●(M2)Renminguangchang – Anshanlu – Haidaguangchang – Chunguangjie – Yidashijicheng – ●(M4) Huadonglu – ●(M1) Dongweilu – ●(M8) Yingkeguangchang – Liujiaqiao – ●(M6) Lüboqiao – Xinjianxiaoxue – Heqingjie – ●(M7) Xinanlu – Sunjiagou – Huawusuo – Xinghaixintiandi – Senlindongwuyuan – Fujiazhuang

Fares
The starting price of tram, light rail and kuaigui in Dalian is 1 yuan; the starting price of ditie in Dalian is 2 yuan, start mileage is of 6 kilometers (including 6 km), promotion mileage is of "6, 6, 8, 8, 10, 10". At the same time, before April 1, 2016, the subway passengers who take line 1 and line 2 with Pearl card will enjoy the discount of 20%.

Tram / Light rail
The Dalianhuochezhan is the section point of Tram #201's, the whole is 2 yuan, 1 yuan per segment (Pearl card: the whole is 1.3 yuan, each 0.9 yuan); Tram #202, the whole is 1 yuan (Pearl card: the whole is 0.95 yuan).

Metro
Line R3 is from 1 yuan to 8 yuan; Line R2 (Metro #202) is from 2 yuan to 7 yuan (Pearl card is no use at this period for Line R2); Line M1 and Line M2 are from 2 yuan to 6 yuan.

Rolling stock

DLoco FG type Rapid transit
Made in Dalian Locomotive and rolling stock Co., LTD. CNR GROUP (DLoco).
Body length is 19 meters, body width is 2.8 meters.
The maximum speed is 100 kilometers per hour, the average speed is 60 kilometers per hour.

See also
 Dalian Tram
 Dalian Metro
 List of metro systems
 Metro systems by annual passenger rides

Notes
a.  Closed between Shahekouhuochezhan and Xinggongjie

b.  Building between Hekou and Caidaling

c.  Between Jichangxinqu and Shimao is the first phase of the project; R1, R7, R9, R10 connect to each other, the total length is about 180 km.

d.  Double-decker tram

References

External links
 大連市交通局官方網站 

Tram transport in China
Rapid transit in China
Underground rapid transit in China